The Chacala River (Cihuatlán River, Marabasco River) is a river of Mexico. It originates in the Sierra de Manantlán, and flows southwestwards to empty into the Pacific Ocean, forming the border between the states of Jalisco to the northwest and Colima to the southeast.

See also
List of rivers of Mexico

References

.

Rivers of Mexico